The 2005 World Indoor Target Archery Championships were held in Aalborg, Denmark from 22–28 March 2005.

Medal summary (individual)

Medal summary (team)

Notes 
World Record 269 points scored by the United States Compound Men's team.

References

E
World Indoor Archery Championships
2005 in Danish sport
International archery competitions hosted by Denmark